is a Japanese actress and  singer. Born in Hiroshima and raised in Tokyo, she made her J-Pop debut on 19 August 1995. She starred in the Japanese original of The Grudge. She married Susumu Fujita in January 2004. They divorced on 22 July 2005. In 2007, Megumi said she was retiring from the entertainment business. However, she reversed course by acting in a remake of the 2004 Thai film, Shutter. It was released March 21, 2008. She portrayed a ghost called Megumi Tanaka.

Personal life
On March 12, 2009, she announced that she was four months pregnant and planning on marrying her boyfriend of two years, a businessman. However, they divorced on September 12, 2015. On March 12, 2016, she announced that she was married to Ryo Kimura.

Discography

Albums 

 1995/09/21 : Blossom
 1996/05/21 : illusion
 1997/03/20 : gradation
 1998/04/01 : i・n・g
 1998/09/01 : Stairs -The Best Songs-

Singles 

 1995/08/19 : この悲しみを乗り越えて
 1996/04/23 : そんなの悲しいね
 1996/09/21 : あなたのそばで
 1997/02/25 : 今でも...あなたが好きだから
 1997/05/28 : 淑女の夢は万華鏡 (ending theme from Kochira Katsushika-ku Kameari Kōen-mae Hashutsujo) 
 1997/10/29 : それでも愛してる
 1998/02/25 : ゆらゆら
 1998/08/21 : Eternity

Filmography

Films 
 1995: Naito heddo (adapted from Night Head)
 2000: Tales of the Unusual
 2000: Sebunzu feisu (Seven's Face)
 2001: Otogirisō (St John's Wort)
 2001: Red Shadow: Akakage
 2003: Ju-on: The Grudge
 2006: Ulysses
 2006: Inugamike no Ichizoku
 2008: Shutter (aka Spirits)
 2009: Tsumi toka batsu toka 
 2017: Cosmetic Wars
 2020: Howling Village

Dramas 
 Fireworks, Should We See It from the Side or the Bottom? (Fuji TV, 1993)
 Kinjirareta Asobi (NTV, 1995)
 Wakaba no Koro (TBS, 1996)
 Kimi ga Jinsei no Toki (TBS, 1997)
 Futari (TV Asahi, 1997)
 Shinryonaikai Ryoko (NTV, 1997)
 Ao no Jidai (TBS, 1998)
 Hashire Komuin (Fuji TV, 1998)
 Genroku Ryoran (NHK, 1999)
 Tengoku ni Ichiban Chikai Otoko as Tsuyuzaki Koharu (TBS, 1999)
 Tengoku no Kiss as Mitarai Asumi (TV Asahi, 1999)
 Suna no ue no Koibitotachi (Fuji TV, 1999)
 Hanamura Daisuke (Fuji TV, 2000, ep11-12)
 Wakaresaseya as Mizusawa Chiharu (YTV, 2001)
 Shin Hoshi no Kinka (NTV, 2001)
 Koisuru Top Lady as Hasegawa Mizuki (Fuji TV, 2002)
 Boku ga Chikyu wo Suku as Tsukishima Kyoko (TBS, 2002)
 Beginner (Fuji TV, 2003)
 Kyohansha (NTV, 2003)
 Konya Hitori no Bed de as Jumonji Azusa (TBS, 2005)
 Jikou Keisatsu (TV Asahi, 2006, ep5)
 Oishii Koroshikata (BS Fuji, 2006)
 Wakatoryo to Kyuunin no Ko (NHK, 2006)
 Aibou 5 (TV Asahi, 2006, ep1)
 Takusan no Ai wo Arigato (たくさんの愛をありがとう) (NTV, 2006)

References

External links 
 Okina Megumi Official Site 
 
 JMDb profile 

1979 births
20th-century Japanese actresses
21st-century Japanese actresses
Japanese film actresses
Japanese television actresses
Japanese women pop singers
Living people
Actors from Hiroshima
Musicians from Hiroshima
20th-century Japanese women singers
20th-century Japanese singers
21st-century Japanese women singers
21st-century Japanese singers